{{Infobox language family
| name          = Eastern Baltic
| region        = In Northern Europe, Baltic region
| familycolor   = Indo-European
| fam2          = Baltic
| child1        = Dnieper Baltic † (?)  – Eastern Galindians  †
| map           = Baltic languages in Europe.svg
| mapcaption    = Extent of Baltic languages in present day Europe with languages traditionally considered to be dialects mentioned in Italics
Eastern Baltic languages
{{legend|#31e6b4|Latgalian}}

The Eastern Baltic languages are a group of languages that along with the extinct Western Baltic languages belong to the branch of the Baltic language family. The Eastern Baltic branch has only two living languages—Latvian and Lithuanian. In some cases, Latgalian and Samogitian are also considered to be separate languages but they are generally treated as dialects. It also includes now-extinct Selonian, Semigallian, and possibly Old Curonian.

Lithuanian is the most-spoken Eastern Baltic language, with more than 3 million speakers worldwide, followed by Latvian, with 1.75 million native speakers.

History

Origins and characteristics 
Originally, East Baltic was presumably native to the north of Eastern Europe, which included modern Latvia, Lithuania, northern parts of current European Russia and Belarus. Dnieper Balts lived in the current territory of Moscow, which was the furthest undisputed eastern territory inhabited by the Baltic people.

Traditionally, it is believed that Western and Eastern Baltic people had already possessed certain unique traits that separated them in the middle of the last millennium BC and began to permanently split between 5th and 3rd century BC. During this time, Western and Eastern Balts adopted different traditions and customs. They had separate ceramics and housebuilding traditions. In addition, both groups had their own burial customs: unlike their Western counterparts, it is believed that Eastern Balts would burn the remains of the dead and scatter the ashes on the ground or nearby rivers and lakes. It is also known that Eastern Balts were much more susceptible to the cultural influences coming from their Baltic Finnic neighbours in the northeast.

The Eastern Baltic languages are less archaic than their Western counterparts with Latvian being the most modern Baltic language. This is mostly because of the influence Baltic Finnic languages had on their development as in the case of stress retraction. Extinct languages of the Eastern family group are poorly understood as they are practically unattested. However, from the analysis of hydronyms and retained loanwords, it is known that Selonian and Old Curonian languages possessed the retention of nasal vowels *an, *en, *in, *un. Also, Selonian, Semigallian and Old Latgalian turned soft velars *k, *g into *c, *dz and sounds *š, *ž into *s, *z. This trait can be observed in hydronyms and oeconyms (e. g., Zirnajai, Zalvas, Zarasai) as well as loanwords preserved in Lithuanian and Latvian dialects. It is believed that Semigallian possessed an uninflected pronoun, which was the equivalent to the Lithuanian savo (e. g., Sem. Savazirgi, Lith. savo žirgai, meaning 'one's horses'). Also, Eastern Balts would in some cases turn diphthong *ei into a monophthong, which was similar to the contemporary *ė. This grammatical innovation later resulted in Lithuanian and Latvian possessing the diphthong *ie (e. g., Lith. dievas, Lat. dievs 'god').

References 

Baltic languages
East Baltic languages